Yu Yunbo (January 1936 – 25 June 2022) was a Chinese politician who served as vice chairman of the Shanghai Municipal Committee of the Chinese People's Political Consultative Conference and deputy procurator-general of Shanghai People's Procuratorate. He also served as vice president of China Zhi Gong Party from 1997 to 2002.

He was a member of the 7th and 8th National Committee of the Chinese People's Political Consultative Conference and was a member of the Standing Committee of the 9th and 10th Chinese People's Political Consultative Conference.

Biography
Yu was born in Fuqing County (now Fuqing), Fujian in January 1936 but was raised in Dutch East Indies (now Indonesia). He settled down in China in 1952. 

After graduating from the Department of International Politics, Renmin University of China, in 1960, he worked in north China's Shanxi province. He joined the faculty of Fudan University in 1974, and worked there until 1985. Since 1985, he worked in the Shanghai Municipal Committee of China Zhi Gong Party. He was deputy procurator-general of Shanghai People's Procuratorate in April 1991, and held that office until November 1996, when he was appointed vice president of the All-China Federation of Returned Overseas Chinese. In 1997, he rose to become vice president of China Zhi Gong Party.

On 25 June 2022, he died of an illness in Shanghai, at the age of 86.

Autobiography

References

1936 births
2022 deaths
People from Fuqing
Renmin University of China alumni
Academic staff of Fudan University
People's Republic of China politicians from Fujian
Chinese Communist Party politicians from Fujian
Members of the 7th Chinese People's Political Consultative Conference
Members of the 8th Chinese People's Political Consultative Conference
Members of the Standing Committee of the 9th Chinese People's Political Consultative Conference
Members of the Standing Committee of the 10th Chinese People's Political Consultative Conference